Miawpukek First Nation is a Mi'kmaq First Nations band government in Newfoundland and Labrador, Canada, with a registered population of 834 living on-reserve as of September 2019, with another 2,223 living off-reserve.
They control the reserve of Samiajij Miawpukek in Bay d'Espoir on the island of Newfoundland. It was formerly known as Conne River until the 1980s. Samiajij Miawpukek was established as a federal Indian reserve in 1987, the first in Newfoundland and Labrador. In 1991, Miawpukek was one of the poorest communities in Atlantic Canada. Due in part to increased education of its members, it has gone on to become the most well-off First Nation in Atlantic Canada after Membertou.

Attractions
The powwow, started in 1996, is held every year.

In 2019, the Miawpukek First Nation opened the "Cannabis Boutique", which they claim is "the first Indigenous-owned and -operated marijuana store in Newfoundland".

See also
 List of communities in Newfoundland and Labrador
 List of Indian reserves in Canada
 Noel Jeddore
 Peter Jeddore

References

External links
 On line picture gallery

First Nations reserves in Newfoundland and Labrador
First Nations governments in Atlantic Canada
Mi'kmaq in Canada
Mi'kmaq governments
Populated coastal places in Canada
Indian reserves in Newfoundland and Labrador
Indigenous peoples in Newfoundland and Labrador
First Nations in Newfoundland and Labrador